Ko Chang-seok (born October 13, 1970) is a South Korean actor. Ko began his career on stage, performing in plays and musicals for many years before moving on to bit parts in films. He once earned his living by working on farms and in iron foundries, then acquired fame through his scene-stealing roles in Jang Hoon's films, notably as the movie director in Rough Cut (2008), and the Vietnamese gang boss in Secret Reunion (2010). He has since become one of the busiest supporting actors in Korean cinema.

Ko's real-life wife and daughter played his character's family in the period film The Showdown (2011).

Filmography

Film

Television series

Web series

Television shows

Theater

Awards and nominations

References

External links

Living people
1970 births
21st-century South Korean male actors
South Korean male film actors
South Korean male television actors
South Korean male stage actors
South Korean male musical theatre actors
Seoul Institute of the Arts alumni
People from Busan